Niklas Roest (born August 3, 1986) is a Norwegian ice hockey player who is currently playing for Sparta Sarpsborg of the GET-ligaen.

Roest competed in the 2013 and 2014 IIHF World Championships, and the 2014 Winter Olympics as a member of the Norway men's national ice hockey team.

Career statistics

Regular season and playoffs

International

References

External links

1986 births
Living people
Ice hockey players at the 2014 Winter Olympics
Ice hockey players at the 2018 Winter Olympics
Manglerud Star Ishockey players
Norwegian ice hockey left wingers
Olympic ice hockey players of Norway
Sparta Warriors players
Ice hockey people from Oslo
Norwegian expatriate ice hockey people
Norwegian expatriate sportspeople in Sweden